Chrzelice Transmitter is a facility for FM and TV-transmission at Chrzelice, Prudnik County in Poland.
Chrzelice Transmitter uses as its antenna mast a  guyed mast.

Transmitted Programmes

Digital Television MPEG 4

FM Radio Programme

External links
 https://web.archive.org/web/20060213090455/http://www.emitel.pl/obiekty/opole.html

See also
 List of masts

Towers in Poland
Prudnik County
Buildings and structures in Opole Voivodeship